Glyphidocera staerae is a moth in the family Autostichidae. It was described by Adamski in 2005. It is found in Costa Rica.

References

Moths described in 2005
Taxa named by David Adamski
Glyphidocerinae